Pokémon (originally "Pocket Monsters") is a series of role-playing video games developed by Game Freak and published by Nintendo and The Pokémon Company. Over the years, a number of spin-off games based on the series have also been developed by multiple companies. While the main series consists of RPGs, spin-off games encompass other genres, such as action role-playing, puzzle, fighting, and digital pet games. Most Pokémon video games have been developed exclusively for Nintendo handhelds, video game consoles, dating from the Game Boy to the current generation of video game consoles.

Main series games/remakes 
{{Video game titles|

{{Video game titles/item
| article= Pokémon Red and Blue
| title= Pocket Monsters Blue (Pokémon Red and Blue)
| date=  (CoroCoro Comic)  (retail)
| refs=
| release= 1996 – Game Boy (CoroCoro Comic)1999 - Game Boy (retail)2016 – 3DS Virtual Console
| multiplereleasedates = no
| notes= * Pocket Monsters Blue was released 8 months after Red and Green and featured updated graphics and dialogue.
 Pocket Monsters Blue was released only in Japan.
 Was the basis for the international versions, Pokémon Red and Blue, released two years later.
 Red, Green and Blue combined have sold more copies than any other Game Boy game, barring Tetris.
 Used Game Boy cartridges but were packaged as Game Boy Color games.
 Blue was re-released on the Nintendo 3DS Virtual Console in 2016.
}}

}}

 Side games 
 Pokémon Stadium series 

 Other side games 

 Spin-off Games 
 Trading Card Games 
 Pokémon Card GB series 

 Play It! series 

 Other Games 

 Pinball games 

Mystery Dungeon series

 Ranger series 

 Rumble series 

Snap series

 Puzzle games 
 Pokémon Puzzle League series 

 Pokémon Trozei series 

 Other puzzle games 

 Pikachu series 

 Arcade games 

 Puck series 

 Pokkén Tournament 

 Mezastar 

 PokéPark series 

 Mobile apps 

 Pokédex 3D and Pokédex 3D Pro Pokédex 3D is an app available for download from the Nintendo eShop. It is a Pokédex, which displays information on Pokémon from Black and White as well as a 3D model. Only a few Pokémon are initially available, and more can be unlocked through means such as SpotPass and StreetPass and AR cards.

On April 21, 2012, Nintendo announced that there would be a National Pokédex version called Pokédex 3D Pro. It was released in Japan on the Nintendo eShop on July 14, 2012, and internationally on November 8, 2012. Unlike the original, the Pro edition of the app is not free, and all Pokémon are available from the start rather than unlocking them over time, although some that are not available can be unlocked by entering a special code on the official website. In addition, it has new background music, modes, more scenes and backgrounds and features the voice for the name of every Pokémon. The Pro edition replaced the original free app as it was removed from the eShop on June 17, 2012 in Japan and on October 1, 2012 internationally. An official iOS version was released on November 15, 2012 but was delisted on November 30, 2015.

 Pokémon Dream Radar 
Pokémon Dream Radar (ポケモン ARサーチャー Pokemon AR Sāchā, literally meaning: "Pokémon Augmented Reality Searcher") is the second downloadable game in the series and it featured Augmented Reality view to capture Pokémon, collecting Dream Orbs and Items in the Interdream Zone. Pokémon Dream Radar allows you to transfer any Pokémon you've captured and any Items you've obtained to a copy of Pokémon Black and White 2 inserted in the Nintendo 3DS cartridge slot to give the players extra in-game content.

 Pokémon Bank Pokémon Bank is a mobile application available on the Nintendo eShop for Nintendo 3DS. It was released in Japan, South Korea, and Taiwan on December 25, 2013, Hong Kong on January 22, 2014, Europe, Australia, and New Zealand on February 4, 2014, and in North and South America on February 5, 2014. It is an online storage system which allows players to store up to 3000 Pokémon and access requires a stable internet connection. The app is free to download, but requires an annual fee in order to access the servers. Bank is compatible with Pokémon X, Y, Omega Ruby, Alpha Sapphire, Sun, Moon, Ultra Sun and Ultra Moon and the game's Pokémon Storage System. Pokémon holding items and a cosplay variant of Pikachu cannot be stored. The additional app Poké Transporter allows players to transfer Pokémon from Pokémon Black, White, Black 2 and White 2 and the Virtual Console releases of Red, Blue, and Yellow. Pokémon Bank was later updated to add Poké Transporter capabilities for Gold, Silver, and Crystal as well.

 Pokémon Go 

The augmented reality mobile game Pokémon Go was released in July 2016 on both Android and iOS platforms. It utilizes internal GPS tracking system in order to find and catch Pokémon in real-time. The system places in-game locations such as Gyms and Pokéstops in predetermined locations (such as landmarks) throughout the real world in order to get the player active and become a Pokémon trainer in real life. The Pokémon themselves spawn randomly, with some conditions; nocturnal Pokémon have a higher chance to spawn at night, and water type pokémon may spawn close to water. Gyms are used to battle and train Pokémon against other players in the area, and nearby PokéStops give free items when spun (they have a 5-minute cooldown per use). It originally featured all Generation 1 Pokémon. In February 2017, Generation 2 Pokémon were added excluding the legendaries of the region, including Suicune, Raikou, Entei, Celebi, Lugia, and Ho-Oh. In July 2017, the missing Legendary Pokémon from the Johto region were added. Niantic has since added Pokémon from the Hoenn, Sinnoh, Unova, Kalos, Alola, Galar and Hisui regions into Pokémon Go. While the title is free-to-play, it also implements microtransactions, allowing players to spend real currency to gain access to more items in game. The game was met with mixed responses when released. In September 2016, Niantic released the Pokémon Go Plus, a $35 wearable, which issues alerts about any events in the game, including the appearance of a Pokémon or nearby PokéStop.

Pokémon Duel

On January 24, 2017, Pokémon Duel, a competitive digital board game was released for mobile devices on the App Store and Google Play. Pokémon Duel, formerly known as Pokémon Co-master, was co-developed with Heroz Japan, a company that specializes in artificial intelligence. Based on the Pokémon Trading Figure board game, players can move Pokémon pieces around a virtual playing field. Upon reaching an opponent's Pokémon, the two may engage in battle. The strategy game lets one play single-player against the computer or compete with other players online.

 Pokémon Playhouse 
In 2017, Nintendo, together with the Pokémon Company, announced the creation of a mobile app targeted at preschool aged children called Pokémon Playhouse.

Pokémon Masters EX

On August 29, 2019, Pokémon Masters, a 3-on-3 battle game was released on the App Store and Google Play. Pokémon Masters was developed by DeNA.
The game can be downloaded from the Pokémon Masters official website Originally named Pokémon Masters, it was renamed Pokémon Masters Ex in August 2020 on the 1st anniversary of the game.

Camp PokémonCamp Pokémon, known as Pokémon Camp in Europe, Australia, and New Zealand, is a free app provided by The Pokémon Company International for Android and iOS. It was first accessible to iOS users on October 21, 2014, and was released for Android devices on April 14, 2016.

 Pokémon Home 

In June 2019, The Pokémon Company announced a new cloud service for storing Pokémon, intended to replace Pokémon Bank. It was later revealed the service would be called Pokémon Home and was released for Nintendo Switch, iOS, and Android. Home would be available in two tiers, a paid premium subscription and a free tier with less storage and a limited feature set. A subscription to Nintendo Switch Online would not be required to use Pokémon Home. It was released in February 2020. The service is primarily aimed toward Pokémon Sword and Shield and Pokémon can be transferred between them and the service at will. Pokémon contained in Pokémon Bank can be transferred to Home but would be a one-way transfer and cannot be transferred back to the aforementioned titles. The same can be said about Pokémon transferred from the Let's Go, Pikachu! and Let's Go, Eevee! titles, except this one way transfer system only applies after you transfer a Pokémon into Pokémon Home, then into Pokémon Sword and Shield. On November 11, 2020, Niantic released an update for Pokémon Go that allows the unidirectional transfer of Pokémon to Pokémon Home.

 Pokémon Smile Pokémon Smile is a free app for Android and iOS devices. The game uses the device's camera to play the game. By brushing your teeth, Pokémon are rescued from bacteria. The game was announced during a Pokémon Presents presentation on June 17, 2020 and was made available later the same day.

 PC and Computer titles 

 Pokémon TCG Online Pokémon TCG Online is the official digital version of the Pokémon Trading Card Game available for PC, iOS, and Android. As of early 2023, the game has received its final expansion set, and is planned to be discontinued in the near future. This is partially due to the application's age, and the arrival of its recent replacement, Pokémon TCG Live, which has been met with mixed opinions from the entire playerbase.

 Pokémon PokéROM Gotta Learn 'em All! Pokémon PokéROM Gotta Learn 'em All! is a series of playable and collectable mini CD-Roms released by Mattel Interactive in 2000. Each CD features math puzzles, print programs to print out Pokémon, build a desktop Pokémon collection, observe Pokémon and much more. The Premier Series Collection Limited Edition Box contains all ten discs in the series.

 Pokémon 2000 Pokémon 2000 was a first-person online only adventure game released by Cyberworld International Corporation in 2000. Created as a promotion for the second Pokémon film for AOL Time Warner, Pokémon 2000 played within Cyberworld's specialized web browser which could display web pages on one side and simple Wolfenstein 3D like 3D worlds on the other. Due to a contract dispute, the game was pulled and is no longer able to be played after being available for four weeks with over one million downloads.

 Pokémon Project Studio Pokémon Project Studio is a computer program released by The Learning Company on November 9, 1999 in the U.S. This program lets the user create all kinds of Pokémon related projects such as calendars or greeting cards. Each version had stock artwork of different Generation I Pokémon. Some Pokémon were version-specific—for example, Kangaskhan was only available in the Blue version, whereas Tauros was only available in the Red version. Stock art of human characters like Ash Ketchum and Professor Oak was also included, and users could also add photos and images saved on their own computer.

 Pokémon: Masters Arena Pokémon: Masters Arena is a Pokémon game compilation developed by ImaginEngine designed for young children. It contains eight games, testing the players' knowledge to prove themselves as a true Pokémon Master. On mastering all eight games, the player earns 8 posters, which can be printed.

 Pokémon: Team Turbo Team Turbo is a Pokémon game developed by ImaginEngine that is a game compilation designed for young children. It contains five racing games which are used to earn power-ups for use in race courses. From the main menu, one can choose to do any of the 6 races, any of the 5 minigames, or do an "Adventure Mode" in which there are races in order, with minigames in between each to earn extra powerups. The game was published by ValuSoft and released in October 2005.

 Pokémon PC Master Pokémon PC Master is a Pokémon game released on June 20, 2006 in Japan. It is supposed to improve children's knowledge of information technology.

 Perdue series 
 Pokémon Team Rocket Blast Off Pokémon Team Rocket Blast Off is a Pokémon game released in North America.

 Pokémon Poké Ball Launcher Pokémon Poké Ball Launcher is a Pokémon game released in North America.

 Pokémon Seek & Find Pokémon Seek & Find is a Pokémon game released in North America.

 Pokémon Card Game Online Pokémon Card Game Online is a Pokémon game released on November 20, 2009 in Japan.

 Pokémon Medallion Battle Pokémon Medallion Battle is a Pokémon game released worldwide on December 23, 2019.

 Pokémon Tower Battle Pokémon Tower Battle'' is a Pokémon game released worldwide on December 23, 2019.

Pokémon mini games (all released in 2001 with the "Pokémon mini" console") 

Pokémon Party Mini

Pokémon Pinball Mini

Pokémon Puzzle Collection

Pokémon Puzzle Collection Vol. 2

Pokémon Zany Cards

Pokémon Tetris

Pokémon Race Mini

Pichu Bros. Mini

Togepi's Great Adventure

Pokémon Breeder Mini

Sega games 
Seven Pokémon games were released for Sega game consoles.

Sega Pico series

Advanced Pico Beena series

Other spin-offs

Notes

References

External links 

 
  

Video games
List
Pokémon